Pogonatum aloides is a species of moss belonging to the family Polytrichaceae.

It is native to Eurasia and Northern America.

References

Polytrichaceae